Cryptandra magniflora is a species of flowering plant in the family Rhamnaceae and is endemic to Victoria (Australia). It is a shrub with cylindrical leaves, and clusters of white, tube-shaped flowers.

Description
The upper surface is mostly glabrous, the lower surface hairy.

Taxonomy and naming
Cryptandra magniflora was first formally described in 1862 by Ferdinand von Mueller in Fragmenta Phytographiae Australiae from specimens collected near the junction of the Murray and Darling Rivers. The specific epithet (magniflora) means "large-flowered".

Distribution and habitat
This cryptandra mainly grows in mallee, north of Ouyen in north-west Victoria.

References

magniflora
Rosales of Australia
Flora of Victoria (Australia)
Plants described in 1862
Taxa named by Ferdinand von Mueller